Aahan Gopinath Achar (born 30 March 1999) is a Singaporean cricketer. In October 2018, he was named in Singapore's squad for the 2018 ICC World Cricket League Division Three tournament in Oman. He played in Singapore's fixture against Kenya on 16 November 2018.

In July 2019, he was named in Singapore's Twenty20 International (T20I) squad for the Regional Finals of the 2018–19 ICC T20 World Cup Asia Qualifier tournament. In September 2019, he was named in Singapore's squad for the 2019 Malaysia Cricket World Cup Challenge League A tournament. He made his List A debut for Singapore, against Qatar, in the Cricket World Cup Challenge League A tournament on 17 September 2019.

Later in September 2019, he was named in Singapore's Twenty20 International (T20I) squad for the 2019–20 Singapore Tri-Nation Series. He made his T20I debut for Singapore, against Zimbabwe, in the Singapore Tri-Nation Series on 29 September 2019. In October 2019, he was added to Singapore's squad for the 2019 ICC T20 World Cup Qualifier tournament in the United Arab Emirates.

References

External links
 

1999 births
Living people
Singaporean cricketers
Singapore Twenty20 International cricketers
Place of birth missing (living people)